The Supreme Order of Christ was the highest order of chivalry awarded by the pope. According to some scholars, it owes its origin to the same Order of Christ of the Knights Templar, from which came the Order of Christ that was awarded by the kings of Portugal and the emperors of Brazil. The Portuguese order had originally both a secular and religious component; by the 18th century, the religious component had died out.

Dispute

The papacy insisted that the right of the Portuguese monarchs to award the honour had been granted by a pope in the Papal Bull Ad ea ex quibus issued in Avignon on 14/15 March 1319. While the bull in itself does not explicitly grant to the pope the right to issue the order, successive popes since John XXII have done so. For many years, the Portuguese monarchy disputed the right of the papacy to award the order, and in one famous case arrested Giovanni Niccolò Servandoni, an Italaian architect, for wearing the papal order. The position of the Crown of Portugal was that the only legitimate fount of honour was the Crown. The position of the Catholic Church is that the pope is the head of every religious order and may appoint, at his discretion without the permission of its superior general, any individual he deems worthy.

Senior papal order

As part of the general re-organisation of papal honours in 1905 by Pope Pius X, the papal Order of Christ was made the most senior papal honour. It was traditionally awarded to Catholic heads of state.

Restriction
The usage of the order was restricted by Pope Paul VI in his 15 April 1966 Papal Bull Equestres Ordinis to Catholic heads of state to whom it might be given only to commemorate very special occasions at which the pope himself was present. It has rarely been awarded since; the last award was made by Pope John Paul II in 1987 to Frà Angelo de Mojana, 77th prince and grand master of the Sovereign Military Order of Malta. With the death of King Baudouin of Belgium in 1993 there are no living members of the Order of Christ.

In ecclesiastical heraldry, individuals awarded this order may depict a collar completely encircling the shield on their coat of arms.

Notable members

 Konrad Adenauer
 Frederick Ferdinand, Duke of Anhalt-Köthen
 Prince Adolf of Auersperg
 Giovanni Baglione
 Baudouin of Belgium
 Ludwig von Benedek
 Otto von Bismarck
 Francesco Borromini
 Nicholas Frederic Brady
 Charles III, Prince of Monaco
 Ludovico Chigi Albani della Rovere
 Marcantonio V Colonna
 René Coty
 Luigi Einaudi
 Archduke Eugen of Austria
 Prince Felix of Bourbon-Parma
 Archduke Franz Ferdinand of Austria
 Ferdinando Fuga
 Maximilian von Fürstenberg
 Charles de Gaulle
 Alejandro Groizard y Gómez de la Serna
 Prince Henry of Prussia (1862–1929)
 Heinrich von Heß
 Isabella II of Spain
 Konstantin of Hohenlohe-Schillingsfürst
 Giovanni Lanfranco
 Albert Lebrun
 Walter von Loë
 Claudio López, 2nd Marquess of Comillas
 Wilhelm Miklas
 Maximilian Karl Lamoral O'Donnell
 Francisco Franco
 Angelo de Mojana di Cologna
 George Robinson, 1st Marquess of Ripon
 Alessandro Ruspoli, 7th Prince of Cerveteri
 Antonio Segni
 Ferdinand van Spoelberch
 Massimo Stanzione
 Umberto II of Italy
 Antonio Aguilar y Correa, Marquis of Vega de Armijo
 Peter Anton von Verschaffelt
 Victor Emmanuel III of Italy
 Éamon de Valera
 Edmund Waterton

See also
Orders, decorations, and medals of the Holy See
Order of Christ (Brazil)
Order of Christ (Portugal)

References

External links

Association of Papal Orders in Great Britain

 
14th-century establishments in the Papal States
1319 establishments in Europe